This is a list of State Protected Monuments as officially reported by and available through the website of the Archaeological Survey of India in the Indian state Tamil Nadu. The monument identifier is a combination of the abbreviation of the subdivision of the list (state, ASI circle) and the numbering as published on the website of the ASI. 86 State Protected Monuments have been recognized by the ASI in Tamil Nadu. Besides the State Protected Monuments, also the Monuments of National Importance in this state might be relevant.

List of state protected monuments 

|}

See also 
 List of State Protected Monuments in India for other State Protected Monuments in India
 List of Monuments of National Importance in Tamil Nadu

References 

Tamil Nadu
State Protected Monuments
State Protected Monuments
State Protected Monuments